San Juan District is one of ten districts of the Sihuas Province in the Ancash Region of Peru.

See also 
 Kuntur Wasi

References

Districts of the Sihuas Province
Districts of the Ancash Region